was the twenty-first of the sixty-nine stations of the Nakasendō. It is located in the present-day town of Miyota, in the Kitasaku District of Nagano Prefecture, Japan.

History
Otai-shuku originated between 473 and 492 AD and developed into a post town over one thousand years later, during the Keichō era. Because Otai-shuku was small there were only five rest areas in the entire post town, daimyōs tended to stay at the neighboring Oiwake-shuku, which was much larger. The Otai-shuku Festival was established to commemorate the 400th anniversary of the founding of the post town; this festival takes place on August 16 of each year.

Neighboring post towns
Nakasendō
Oiwake-shuku - Otai-shuku - Iwamurada-shuku

References

Stations of the Nakasendō
Stations of the Nakasendo in Nagano Prefecture